The Soccer Six was an annual indoor football tournament organized the Football League in England. The first year of the competition was for the Midlands clubs only, but expanded for clubs nationwide every year after.

History 

The competition was inspired by the success of Major Indoor Soccer League that ran between 1978 and 1992 in the United States. The popularity of the Soccer Six coincided with the six-year ban English clubs faced from UEFA competitions in 1985.

A pilot tournament sponsored by Atari was run for football clubs in the Midlands at the NEC in Birmingham in 1982. The Football League opened the competition to all First Division clubs in 1982. All 21 top flight teams entered the competition in 1988 plus Manchester City of the Second Division.

The tournament took place in December of each year until it was cancelled in 1991. Tournament highlights were covered by the BBC's Sportsnight. Sponsorship by Courage and finally Guinness followed. Matches lasted a total of 15 minute split in to two halves and had the rolling substitutions rule

Other basic rules included a team must always have a players in the opposition half, a player could not shoot inside the marked yellow box and if the goalkeeper passed the ball to his team mate, that player could not pass back to the goalkeeper. The sin-bin was in use for the more serious offenders.

Winners

See also 
Tennents' Sixes
National Fives
Courage Brewery
Guinness

References 

Defunct football cup competitions in England
Recurring sporting events disestablished in 1990
1990 disestablishments in England
Indoor soccer competitions
Recurring sporting events established in 1982
1982 establishments in England
Atari